This list of snakes of Italy includes all snakes in the state of Italy.

Non-venomous 

 Natrix natrix
 Natrix tessellata
 Natrix maura
 Hierophis Viridiflavus
 Zamenis longissimus
 Elaphe quatuorlineata
 Coronella austriaca
 Coronella girondica
 Hemorrhois hippocrepis

Venomous 

 Vipera aspis

Italy
snakes
Snakes